Cantiague Park is a public park maintained by the Nassau County Department of Parks, Recreation, and Museums, located in Hicksville, New York.

History 
Cantiague Park was opened by Nassau County to the public in 1961 in response to a growing population. It was the second major park opened by the county, the first being Eisenhower Park.

In the 2000s, Cantiague Park was one of several parks Nassau County considered transferring ownership of to the local towns (in this case, transferring control of Cantiague Park to the Town of Oyster Bay). The park ultimately remains owned by Nassau County.

Activities

Athletics 

 Five tennis courts
 Turf baseball and softball fields
 Three basketball courts
 Six handball and paddleball courts
 Multipurpose turf field
 Baseball and softball batting cage

Golf 
The park features a 1,878 yard, 9-hole golf course and a driving range. For families, there is also an 18-hole miniature golf course.

Ice Skating 
Cantiague Park is home to an indoor-skating-rink that has been used in the past by both professionals and "regular" people. Olympic gold medalist Nancy Kerrigan performed there in 2004 and the New York Islanders practiced in this facility from 1979 to 1992.

Swimming 
The park has a large swimming complex with:

 An Olympic-sized pool
 Two water slides
 Diving pool
 "Kiddie" pool
 Training pool
 Waterplay area

Other Activities 
There is a generally large gaming, playground and picnic area for all to enjoy with chess and checker boards.

References

External links 

 Cantiague Park Website

Oyster Bay (town), New York
Parks in Nassau County, New York
Swimming venues in New York (state)
Golf clubs and courses in New York (state)
Urban public parks